|}

The Prix Messidor is a Group 3 flat horse race in France open to thoroughbreds aged three years or older. It is run at Maisons-Laffitte over a distance of 1,600 metres (about 1 mile), and it is scheduled to take place each year in July.

History
The event was established in 1949, and it was originally held at Saint-Cloud. It was initially called the Prix de Messidor, a name derived from messis, the Latin word for "harvest". The present title, without the "de", was introduced in 1955.

For a period the race was switched between Maisons-Laffitte (1963–65, 1968–69) and Saint-Cloud (1966–67, 1970–72). It began a longer spell at Maisons-Laffitte in 1973.

The race was transferred to Deauville in 1997. It returned to Maisons-Laffitte in 2005.

Records
Most successful horse (2 wins):
 Catilina – 1962, 1963

Leading jockey (6 wins):
 Yves Saint-Martin – Catilina (1962, 1963), Cripton (1964), Irish Minstrel (1969), Tassmoun (1980), Ya Zaman (1981)

Leading trainer (13 wins):
 André Fabre – Mille Balles (1984), Fitzwilliam Place (1987), Mill Native (1988), Polish Precedent (1989), Acteur Francais (1991), Fanmore (1993), Neuilly (1997), Dansili (1999), Valixir (2005), Intello (2013), Fractional (2015), Vadamos (2016), Impulsif (2019)

Leading owner (4 wins):
 Aga Khan IV – Cripton (1964), Tassmoun (1980), Valixir (2005), Alnadana (2009)

Winners since 1978

 The 2019 running moved to Deauville during unsafely track.
 The 2021 running moved to Chantilly due to the closure of Maisons-Laffitte.
 The 2022 running moved to Chantilly due to the closure of Maisons-Laffitte.

Earlier winners

 1949: Beverly
 1950: Philactis
 1951:
 1952: no race
 1953: Pomare
 1954: Phlox
 1955: Chargeur
 1956: Cigalon
 1957–59: no race
 1960: Fin Bec
 1961: Pen Mane
 1962: Catilina
 1963: Catilina
 1964: Cripton
 1965: Red Slipper
 1966: Agy
 1967: Morris Dancer
 1968: Fisc
 1969: Irish Minstrel
 1970: Brabant
 1971: Joshua
 1972: Arosa
 1973: Martinmas
 1974: El Toro
 1975: Son of Silver
 1976: Dona Barod
 1977: Malecite

See also
 List of French flat horse races
 Recurring sporting events established in 1949 – this race is included under its original title, Prix de Messidor.

References
 France Galop / Racing Post:

 france-galop.com – A Brief History: Prix Messidor.
 galop.courses-france.com – Prix Messidor – Palmarès depuis 1980.
 galopp-sieger.de – Prix Messidor.
 horseracingintfed.com – International Federation of Horseracing Authorities – Prix Messidor (2016).
 pedigreequery.com – Prix Messidor.

Open mile category horse races
Maisons-Laffitte Racecourse
Horse races in France